Antsiferovskaya is a rural locality (a village) in Tiginskoye Rural Settlement, Vozhegodsky District, Vologda Oblast, Russia. The population was 59 as of 2002.

Geography 
The distance to Vozhega is 34 km, to Gridino is 11 km. Ogarkovskaya, Stolbikha, Khmylitsa are the nearest rural localities.

References 

Rural localities in Vozhegodsky District